Game Studio may refer to:
 Video game developer (game studio), a company specialized in the development of video games
 Game Studio (company), a game studio headquartered in Tokyo, Japan
 3D GameStudio, a 3D game engine
 GameMaker Studio, a 2D game engine originally developed by Mark Overmars